Olivér Halassy (né Haltmayer; 31 July 1909 – 10 September 1946) was a Hungarian water polo player and freestyle swimmer who competed at the 1928, 1932 and 1936 Summer Olympics.

Halassy lost his left leg below the knee when he was hit by a train at the age of 11. He later became the first amputee swimmer to compete in the Olympics. He was a member of the Hungarian water polo teams that won one silver and two gold medals in 1928, 1932 and 1936. He played all matches and scored three, eleven, and six goals, respectively.

Halassy won three European water polo titles, in 1931, 1934, and 1938. He also became European champion in 1500 metres freestyle swimming in 1931, a few hours after he helped his water polo team to victory. Nationally he won 25 swimming titles and set 12 records.

Due to his disability, Halassy was exempted from military service during World War II. After retiring from competitions, he worked as an auditor at City Hall. He was killed by a Soviet soldier near his home in Budapest, in what Hungarian sources called "tragic circumstances." Other accounts indicate that he was coming home by taxi late at night when he was murdered by occupying Soviet soldiers in a robbery or mugging. His death came just days before his wife gave birth to their third child. 

Halassy was inducted into the International Swimming Hall of Fame in 1978.

Notes

See also
 Hungary men's Olympic water polo team records and statistics
 List of Olympic champions in men's water polo
 List of Olympic medalists in water polo (men)
 List of members of the International Swimming Hall of Fame

References

External links

 

1909 births
1946 deaths 
1946 murders in Hungary
Hungarian male freestyle swimmers
Hungarian male water polo players
Hungarian male swimmers
Male murder victims
Olympic gold medalists for Hungary in water polo
Olympic silver medalists for Hungary in water polo
People from Újpest
Water polo players from Budapest
Water polo players at the 1928 Summer Olympics
Water polo players at the 1932 Summer Olympics
Water polo players at the 1936 Summer Olympics
Hungarian murder victims
People murdered in Hungary
European Aquatics Championships medalists in swimming
European champions for Hungary
Medalists at the 1936 Summer Olympics
Medalists at the 1932 Summer Olympics
Medalists at the 1928 Summer Olympics
Hungarian people executed by the Soviet Union
20th-century Hungarian people